The Altar of Athena Polias was a former structure on the Acropolis of Athens dedicated to the goddess Athena.

The altar's foundations were laid in 525 B.C. by the sons of the Athenian dictator Peisistratus, but may have overlaid an earlier temple constructed between 599 and 550. The altar itself stood within a narrow temple atop a marble pediment depicting battles between gods and giants. Images of Athena are shown as dominant and victorious within the armies of the gods.

References

Acropolis of Athens